Para Hills West  is a suburb of Adelaide, South Australia, and is within the City of Salisbury. It is on the eastern side of Main North Road, opposite Parafield Airport. The other boundaries are McIntyre Road, Bridge Road and Maxwell Road.

It has two schools, Para Hills West Primary School and Para Hills High School.

References

Suburbs of Adelaide